Upasana Makati is a Mumbai-based entrepreneur, founder of White Print, and activist for the visually impaired. In 2016, she was named one of Forbes India's 30 Under 30.

Education 
Makati studied communication at the University of Ottawa.

White Print 
In 2013, Upasana Makati considered how visually impaired people began their day, so she visited schools to find out. After discovering few options for the visually impaired to read without the assistance of a screen reader, she founded White Print, India's first English lifestyle magazine published in braille. The magazine prints 64 pages and covers topics like art, sports, politics, and film.

The magazine is a for-profit, paid for via traditional methods like subscribers and corporate advertisements.

References 

21st-century Indian businesswomen
Living people
Year of birth missing (living people)
Place of birth missing (living people)
University of Ottawa alumni
Businesswomen from Maharashtra
Businesspeople from Mumbai
Indian magazine founders
21st-century Indian businesspeople